Widowspeak is the debut album by Widowspeak, released in 2011 by Captured Tracks. At Metacritic, which assigns a normalised rating out of 100 to reviews from mainstream critics, Widowspeak received an average score of 75, based on 10 reviews, indicating "generally favorable reviews".

Track listing
"Puritan"
"Harsh Realm"
"Nightcrawlers"
"In the Pines"
"Limbs"
"Gun Shy"
"Hard Times"
"Fir Coat"
"Half Awake"
"Ghost Boy"

References

External links 

2011 debut albums
Captured Tracks albums